Margaret Hutchinson Rousseau (27 October 1910 – 12 January 2000) was an American chemical engineer who designed the first commercial penicillin production plant. She was the first female member of the American Institute of Chemical Engineers.

Life
Hutchinson was born in 1910 in Houston, Texas, the daughter of a clothing store owner. She received her Bachelor of Science degree from Rice Institute in 1932 and her Doctor of Science degree in chemical engineering from MIT in 1937, the first woman to earn a doctorate in the subject in the USA. Her thesis topic was The effect of solute on the liquid film resistance in gas absorption.

On 1 May 1939, she married William Caubu Rousseau, a co-worker at E.B. Badger & Sons, who was later a chemical engineering lecturer at MIT. They had one son, William.

She died 12 January 2000, aged 89, at her home in Weston, Massachusetts.

Career
Hutchinson started her professional career with E. B. Badger in Boston.  During the Second World War, she oversaw the design of production plants for the strategically important materials of penicillin and synthetic rubber. Her development of deep-tank fermentation of penicillium mold enabled large-scale production of penicillin. She worked on the development of high-octane gasoline for aviation fuel. Her later work included improved distillation column design and plants for the production of ethylene glycol and glacial acetic acid.

An ethylene glycol plant was recently in the process of construction deep in the heart of Texas, when an indignant workman watching a tall, blonde beauty boss the project, said to his foreman: "Who does that dame think she is, strutting around here?” “Oh, her!” the foreman shrugged with a grin, “Well, I’ll tell you Buck, she’s just the dame who designed this whole darn plant.”

Hutchinson retired in 1961, and later became an overseer of the Boston Symphony Orchestra.

Honors
In 1945, Hutchinson became the first woman to be accepted as a member of the American Institute of Chemical Engineers. In 1955 she received the Achievement Award of the Society of Women Engineers. In 1983 she was the first female recipient of the prestigious Founders Award of the AIChE.

References

Images
Walter Reuther Library Margaret Hutchinson Rousseau, Portrait (1955)
Walter Reuther Library Margaret Hutchinson Rousseau, Portrait (1961)

1910 births
2000 deaths
Rice University alumni
MIT School of Engineering alumni
Engineers from Houston
American chemical engineers
American women engineers
Fellows of the American Institute of Chemical Engineers
20th-century American engineers
People from Weston, Massachusetts
20th-century American women scientists
Women chemical engineers